Peeter Olesk (born 22 April 1993, in Põlva) is an Estonian sport shooter. In 2013 he won a gold in the 25m Standard Pistol, at the European Shooting Championships. He has also won the Estonian junior championship in shooting 13 times.

He competed at the 2016 Summer Olympics. 

He has qualified for the 2020 Summer Olympics.

In 2022, Olesk won a bronze medal at the ISSF World Pistol / Rifle Championships in the ISSF 25 meter pistol event in Cairo.

References

1993 births
Living people
Estonian male sport shooters
Olympic shooters of Estonia
Shooters at the 2016 Summer Olympics
People from Põlva
European Games competitors for Estonia
Shooters at the 2015 European Games
Shooters at the 2019 European Games
Shooters at the 2020 Summer Olympics
21st-century Estonian people